The 2016 African Fencing Championships were held in Algiers, Algeria in April.

Medal summary

Men's events

Women's events

Medal table
 Host

References
The-Sports Results of the 2016 African Fencing Championships

2016
African Fencing Championships
International sports competitions hosted by Algeria
2016 in Algerian sport
Fencing competitions in Algeria